Guatemala competed at the 2020 Summer Olympics in Tokyo. Originally scheduled to take place from 24 July to 9 August 2020, the Games were postponed to 23 July to 8 August 2021, because of the COVID-19 pandemic. It was the nation's fifteenth appearance at the Summer Olympics since its debut in 1952, despite failing to register any athletes in three other editions (1956 to 1964).

Competitors
The following is the list of number of competitors participating in the Games:

Athletics

Guatemalan athletes further achieved the entry standards, either by qualifying time or by world ranking, in the following track and field events (up to a maximum of 3 athletes in each event):

Track and road events
Men

Women

Badminton

Guatemala entered two badminton players to compete into the Olympic tournament. Slated to compete at his fourth consecutive Games, Kevin Cordón was selected among the top 40 individual shuttlers to compete in the men's singles based on the BWF World Race to Tokyo Rankings, with Nikté Sotomayor accepting a spare berth freed up by one of the original entrants on the women's side.

Cycling

Road
Guatemala entered one rider to compete in the men's Olympic road race, by virtue of his top 50 national finish (for men) in the UCI World Ranking.

Judo
 
Guatemala qualified one judoka for the men's extra-lightweight category (60 kg) at the Games. Rio 2016 Olympian José Ramos accepted a continental berth from the Americas as the nation's top-ranked judoka outside of direct qualifying position in the IJF World Ranking List of June 28, 2021.

Modern pentathlon
 
Guatemalan athletes qualified for the following spots to compete in modern pentathlon. Rio 2016 Olympian Charles Fernández secured a selection in men's event with a gold medal victory at the 2019 Pan American Games in Lima.

Rowing

Guatemala qualified one boat in the women's lightweight double sculls for the Games by finishing last in the A-final and securing the second of three berths available at the 2021 FISA Americas Olympic Qualification Regatta in Rio de Janeiro, Brazil, signifying the country's return to the sport for the first time since 1984.

Qualification Legend: FA=Final A (medal); FB=Final B (non-medal); FC=Final C (non-medal); FD=Final D (non-medal); FE=Final E (non-medal); FF=Final F (non-medal); SA/B=Semifinals A/B; SC/D=Semifinals C/D; SE/F=Semifinals E/F; QF=Quarterfinals; R=Repechage

Sailing

Guatemalan sailors qualified one boat in each of the following classes through the class-associated Worlds, and the continental regattas.

M = Medal race; EL = Eliminated – did not advance into the medal race

Shooting

Guatemalan shooters achieved quota places for the following events by virtue of their best finishes at the 2018 ISSF World Championships, the 2019 ISSF World Cup series, the 2019 Pan American Games, and Championships of the Americas, as long as they obtained a minimum qualifying score (MQS) by May 31, 2020.

Swimming

Guatemalan swimmers further achieved qualifying standards in the following events (up to a maximum of 2 swimmers in each event at the Olympic Qualifying Time (OQT), and potentially 1 at the Olympic Selection Time (OST)):

Weightlifting 

Guatemala entered one female weightlifter into the Olympic competition. Scarleth Ucelo accepted a spare berth unused by Oceania as the next highest-ranked weightlifter vying for qualification in the women's +87 kg category based on the IWF Absolute World Rankings.

See also
Guatemala at the 2019 Pan American Games

References

Nations at the 2020 Summer Olympics
2020
2021 in Guatemalan sport